The Petlyakov VI-100 (Visotnyi Istrebitel – high altitude fighter) was a fighter/dive bomber aircraft designed and built in the USSR from 1938.

Development
The VI-100 was first conceived in 1938 by a team led by Vladimir Petlyakov at STO-100, it was an aerodynamically-clean all-metal monoplane with turbo-supercharged engines.  Constructed using light alloy stressed skin the VI-100 had electrical servo-motors in the flying controls and automatic adjustment of the gunsight with angle of attack, as well as pressure cabins for pilot and radio-operator/gunner, and an extensive 28V DC electrical system. Originally intended to carry a 3in calibre gun with 24 rounds in a drum, the large calibre gun was replaced by racks under centre-section to carry 100(220 lb),200(440 lb) or 500 kg(1,100 lb) bombs as well as two ShVAK and two ShKAS in the nose and a handheld ShKAS on a flexible mounting in the rear cockpit. Due to delays in the production of its unique pressurised cockpit, the aircraft was not built until late 1939, with the first flight, piloted by P.M. Stefanovskiy with I.V. Markov as engineer, on 23 December. During the 1940 May Day Parade the VI-100 was rolled in front of the dais with the undercarriage extended, but interest in a dedicated high-altitude interceptor waned during 1940 and Petlyakov's team were assigned the priority task of transforming the VI-100 into the PB-100 three seat dive bomber by 1 June 1940.

Specifications

References

External links
http://www.ctrl-c.liu.se/misc/ram/100.html 

1930s Soviet fighter aircraft
Petlyakov aircraft
Twin-engined piston aircraft
Aircraft first flown in 1939